QSI International School of Chengdu  is a private international school in the American Garden development in Chengdu, Sichuan, China. The school, using a U.S.-based curriculum, resides in two buildings.

The school is accredited by the Middle States Association of Colleges and Schools.

History 
QSI (Quality School International) was founded by James Gilson and Duane Root as a non-profit educational organization.  The original school campus consisted of an apartment building near the American Consulate, but in 2006 moved to a larger campus in American Garden.

See also 
 Americans in China
 Consulate General of the United States, Chengdu

Notes

References

External links 

 
 
 "成都美国学校（QSI）." Invest in Chengdu (投资成都网), Chengdu Municipal Investment Promotion Commission (成都市投资促进委员会) (government website) 

International schools in Chengdu
American international schools in China
Educational institutions established in 2002
2002 establishments in China